Roberto Del Giudice (25 September 1940 – 25 November 2007) was an Italian actor and voice actor.

Biography
Born in Milan, Del Giudice studied at the Silvio d'Amico National Academy of Dramatic Arts and he began his career in the 1960s mainly working as a television and stage actor. His roles were fairly minor. He then eventually found success as a voice dubber. He was well known for voicing Arsène Lupin III in the Italian version of the Lupin III manga series, and currently has voiced the character longer than any voice actor. He was also famous for providing the Italian voices of Miss Piggy in The Muppets, Zazu in The Lion King film series, Benny in Who Framed Roger Rabbit and Death in Family Guy.

Del Giudice was renowned for dubbing live action characters as well. He voiced Lee Majors in most of his work, most notably The Six Million Dollar Man as well as Terry Jones in Monty Python's Flying Circus. He even lent his voice to the character Neelix in Star Trek: Voyager and Snowbell in the last two succeeding Stuart Little films, replacing television presenter Paolo Bonolis, who voiced him in the first film.

Death
Del Giudice died in Rome on the evening of 25 November 2007, at the age of 67, after suffering a long illness. He was buried at the Cimitero Flaminio.

Dubbing roles

Animation
Arsène Lupin III in Lupin III (1979-2007)
Miss Piggy in The Muppet Show (2nd voice)
Miss Piggy in The Muppet Movie
Miss Piggy in The Great Muppet Caper
Miss Piggy (Emily Cratchit) / Robin the Frog (Tiny Tim Cratchit) in The Muppet Christmas Carol
Miss Piggy (Benjamina Gunn) in Muppet Treasure Island
Miss Piggy in Muppets From Space
Miss Piggy in It's a Very Merry Muppet Christmas Movie
Miss Piggy in The Muppets' Wizard of Oz
Zazu in The Lion King
Zazu in The Lion King II: Simba's Pride 
Zazu in The Lion King 1½
Zazu in Timon & Pumbaa
Zazu in Disney's House of Mouse
Benny the Cab in Who Framed Roger Rabbit
Kwicky Koala in The Kwicky Koala Show
Porky Pig in The Bugs Bunny/Road Runner Movie
Death in Family Guy (seasons 1-5)
Loopy De Loop in Loopy De Loop
Precious Pupp in Precious Pupp
Snowbell in Stuart Little 2
Snowbell in Stuart Little 3: Call of the Wild
Nergal in The Grim Adventures of Billy & Mandy (seasons 1-3)
Le Quack in Courage the Cowardly Dog (seasons 1-3)
Frodo Baggins in The Lord of the Rings
Martin Hacker in Gargoyles
Muscles in Jerry's Cousin
Dynomutt in Dynomutt, Dog Wonder
Various characters in SilverHawks

Live action
Steve Austin in The Six Million Dollar Man
Steve Austin in The Bionic Woman
Bo Duke in The Dukes of Hazzard (seasons 5-6)
Heath Barkley in The Big Valley
Neelix in Star Trek: Voyager
Corporal Reyes in Zorro (1992 redub)
Terry Jones's roles in Monty Python's Flying Circus
Willi Keun in The Devil Strikes at Night
Frederick Keinszig in The Godfather Part III
Norman Bates in Psycho IV: The Beginning
Dr. McClean in Superman III
Almanzo Wilder in Little House on the Prairie
Mike Yanagita in Fargo
Wally Thurman in He Said, She Said
Leo Franks in 52 Pick-Up
Ed Couch in Fried Green Tomatoes
Lucky Leadbetter in Up at the Villa
Gwildor in Masters of the Universe
Sonny Crawford in The Last Picture Show
Sonny Crawford in Texasville
Pee-wee Herman in Big Top Pee-wee
Murray in Torch Song Trilogy

Video games
Arsène Lupin III in Lupin the 3rd: Treasure of the Sorcerer King
Arsène Lupin III in Lupin the Third: Lupin is Dead, Zenigata is in Love

References

External links
 
 
 

1940 births
2007 deaths
Male actors from Milan
Italian male voice actors
Italian male stage actors
Italian male television actors
Italian male video game actors
Italian voice directors
Accademia Nazionale di Arte Drammatica Silvio D'Amico alumni
20th-century Italian male actors
21st-century Italian male actors
Burials at the Cimitero Flaminio